The 2012 Toronto Argonauts season was the 55th season for the team in the Canadian Football League and their 140th season overall. The Argonauts finished in 2nd place in the East Division with a respectable 9–9 record, improving on their 6–12 record from 2011. The Argos hosted their first home playoff game since 2007 against the Edmonton Eskimos, the crossover team from the West, which the Argos won 42–26. Their next opponent was the Montreal Alouettes. In a close game, the Argonauts came out on top 27–20 and made it to the Grey Cup game. The Argonauts won the 100th Grey Cup 35–22 over the Calgary Stampeders.

Offseason

CFL draft 
The 2012 CFL Draft took place on May 3, 2012 live at 3:00 PM EDT. The Argonauts had six selections in the six-round draft, with no picks in the first and third rounds after completing trades for quarterbacks Ricky Ray and Steven Jyles respectively.

Preseason

Regular season 

With a 31-26 win over the Saskatchewan Roughriders on October 27, the Argonauts clinched a playoff spot for the first time since 2010. It also ensured that the Argonauts would play at home in the playoffs, something Toronto had not accomplished since the club's 2007 season.

Season standings

Season schedule 
 Win
 Loss
 Tie

Roster

Coaching staff

Postseason

Schedule

Bracket

*-Team won in Overtime.

East Semi-Final

East Final

Grey Cup

References

External links
2012 Toronto Argonauts at Official Site

Toronto Argonauts seasons
Grey Cup championship seasons
Toro